Jack Webb (27 May 1905 – 23 May 1992) was  a former Australian rules footballer who played with Footscray and North Melbourne in the Victorian Football League (VFL).

Notes

External links 
		

1905 births
1992 deaths
Australian rules footballers from Victoria (Australia)
Western Bulldogs players
North Melbourne Football Club players